The Ministry responsible for Emergency Measures is a government position in the province of Manitoba, Canada.  It is not a full ministerial portfolio, and has always been held by a member of the government with other ministerial responsibilities.

The position was created on September 25, 2002, partly in response to the events of September 11, 2001.  The current minister responsible for Emergency Measures is Steve Ashton.

List of Ministers of Emergency Measures

Source: 

Emergency Measures, Minister responsible for